Ally McCrae (born 1987) is a radio DJ best known for presenting the BBC Introducing show on BBC Radio 1 with Jen Long. He previously presented the BBC Introducing in Scotland show until it ended in June 2012. He is co-creator of Detour Scotland.
In 2011, Scotland on Sunday ranked him Scotland's 9th "Most Eligible Man".

Introducing
On 2 November 2010 it was announced that Ally McCrae would take over from Vic Galloway as presenter of BBC Radio 1 Introducing show as part of a UK wide shake up of BBC Radio 1's Introducing set up. He now presents the BBC Introducing show with Jen Long. He was also the UK voice actor of Jet-Vac from the Skylanders series.

In June 2014, it was announced that from September 1, 2014, the BBC Introducing show on a Sunday would no longer be broadcast, hence ending McCrae's career at the station.

Detour Scotland
Detour Scotland was primarily created as a podcast for featuring unsigned Scottish bands but soon gained a reputation for putting on gigs, including 'The Wee Jaunt'. These gigs were held around the Glasgow area with the audience being taken round a host of locations, where several different local bands would perform sets everywhere from dark alley-ways to a large pond in Rouken Glen Park. Detour also runs events in several more common music venues around Scotland and runs an online video blog.

Education
McCrae is an alumnus of Stirling University where he obtained a degree in Film and Media Studies and was the station manager of Stirling University's Air3 student radio station.

References

Living people
1987 births
Scottish radio presenters
Alumni of the University of Stirling
BBC Radio 1 presenters